Frontenac was an electoral district of the Legislative Assembly of the Parliament of the Province of Canada, in Canada West, based on Frontenac County. It was created in 1841, upon the establishment of the Province of Canada by the union of Upper Canada and Lower Canada. Frontenac was represented by one member in the Legislative Assembly.  It was abolished in 1867, upon the creation of Canada and the province of Ontario.

Boundaries 

Frontenac electoral district was located in the eastern area of Canada West (now the province of Ontario) on the north shore of Lake Ontario, at the entrance of the Saint Lawrence River.  The town of Kingston was the  major centre, although Kingston was a separate electoral district.

The Union Act, 1840 had merged the two provinces of Upper Canada and Lower Canada into the Province of Canada, with a single Parliament.  The separate parliaments of Lower Canada and Upper Canada were abolished.Union Act, 1840, 3 & 4 Vict., c. 35, s. 2.  The Union Act provided that the pre-existing electoral boundaries of Upper Canada would continue to be used in the new Parliament, unless altered by the Union Act itself.

Frontenac County had been an electoral district in the Legislative Assembly of Upper Canada,  and its boundaries were not altered by the Union Act. Those boundaries had originally been set by a proclamation of the first Lieutenant Governor of Upper Canada, John Graves Simcoe, in 1792:

The boundaries had been further defined by a statute of Upper Canada in 1798:

The only change from those boundaries in 1841 was that the county seat, Kingston, was no longer included in Frontenac riding.  The Union Act provided that Kingston was its own electoral district in the new Parliament.  The boundaries of Kingston electoral district were defined by the Governor General, and any parts of the town which were not included in Kingston electoral district were included in Frontenac.

Members of the Legislative Assembly 

Frontenac was represented by one member in the Legislative Assembly. The following were the members for Frontenac.

Abolition 

The district was abolished on July 1, 1867, when the British North America Act, 1867 came into force, creating Canada and splitting the Province of Canada into Quebec and Ontario.  It was succeeded by electoral districts of the same name in the House of Commons of Canada and the Legislative Assembly of Ontario.

References 

.

  Electoral districts of Canada West